Joanna Klatten (born 2 March 1985) is a French professional golfer.

Klatten started playing golf at the age of 7, and while at Georgia State University was a 2007 first-team All-CAA selection. She graduated from the College of Charleston in 2009, with a degree in Business Administration and Marketing. She represented France in the European Girls' Team Championship in 2003 and won the Coupe Cachard of the Golf de St. Cloud in 2006 with the amateur course record of 63 (−9). She turned professional after having passed the Ladies European Tour qualifications in December 2010.  

Joining the LPGA Tour in 2014, Klatten quickly become known as one of the tour's longest players, as she finished third in driving distance her debut season in 2014. The following year she won the Kia Power Drive crown and took home a brand new Kia Sorento, with drives of on average of 274.4 yards on the season, over five yards longer than her nearest competitor. 

In addition to winning four tournaments on the ALPG Tour, top performances include finishing sixth at the 2016 Lotte Championship on the LPGA Tour and third at the 2013 Open de Espana and the 2019 Lacoste Ladies Open de France.

Professional wins (4)

ALPG Tour wins (4)

Results in LPGA majors

CUT = missed the half-way cut
"T" = tied

Team appearances
Amateur
European Girls' Team Championship (representing France): 2003
European Lady Junior's Team Championship (representing France): 2004
European Ladies' Team Championship (representing France): 2008

References

External links

French female golfers
Ladies European Tour golfers
LPGA Tour golfers
Golfers from Paris
Georgia State Panthers athletes
College of Charleston Cougars athletes
1985 births
Living people
21st-century French women